Ereis distincta is a species of beetle in the family Cerambycidae. It was described by Maurice Pic in 1935. It is known to inhabit Vietnam.

References

Mesosini
Beetles described in 1935